Keith Eck (born November 28, 1955) is a former offensive lineman who played one season for the New York Giants of the National Football League.   He played college football at UCLA.

Early life
Eck attended Crespi Carmelite High School in Encino, California where he played baseball and football.  As a senior, he was voted the El Camino Real League’s most valuable lineman and earned recognition from the United Savings Helms Athletic Foundation of All Southern California High School Football First-team.  IN 2008 he was inducted into the Crespi Athletic Hall of Fame.

College
At the University of California, Los Angeles, Eck played center and guard.  As a senior, he was Second-team All-Pac-8 as well as receiving the UCLA award for most improved player.

Professional career
In 1977 Eck played for the Washington Redskins professional football team, but was placed on injured reserve for the 1977 season.  The following year, he returned to UCLA to coach the offensive tackles and tight-ends.  In 1979 Eck played for the New York Giants, backing up Jim Clack at center as well as being the special teams snapper for punts and field goals.

In 1980 his football career ended abruptly when he suffered a heart attack on an airplane en route to his first pre-season training camp for his second year with the New York Giants.

Personal life
After football, Eck has worked in the financial services industry, and in 1990 founded his own financial and insurance company.  He lives in La Costa, California, with his wife, Marcela, and their three children.

References

External links
Keith Eck Financial & Insurance Services website
Crespi Carmelite High School Football- Player Archive

1955 births
Living people
American football offensive guards
American football centers
New York Giants players
UCLA Bruins football players